Edwin A. Buckham is Chief of Staff to U.S. Representative Marjorie Taylor Greene. He is a longtime congressional staffer and former lobbyist.

He served as chief of staff to then Majority Whip Tom DeLay from approximately 1995 to 1998. Buckham had run the House Republican Study Committee in the early 1990s, while Tom DeLay was the Committee's Chairman, where Buckham hired Jim Backlin, also of Maranatha Campus Ministries, now Vice President for Legislative Affairs for the Christian Coalition previously run by Ralph Reed. He was a lobbyist for the American Traffic Safety Services Association from 2004-2005. 	

Buckham is a lay (non-ordained) evangelical minister, who served as an elder of the Washington D.C. chapter of the controversial and politically active church, Maranatha Campus Ministries, then later as a deacon of a small church in Frederick, Maryland.

Abramoff scandal 	 
Most of the $3.02 million in revenues of the U.S. Family Network came from clients of Jack Abramoff. $1,022,729 of that money was then paid by USFN to Buckham and his wife, Wendy, during a five-year period ending in 2001, via their lobbying firm, the Alexander Strategy Group. 	 

In January 2006 Buckham closed Alexander Strategy Group, and left the lobbying business. Buckham said that the company was fatally damaged by publicity from the federal investigation into the affairs of Abramoff.

References

External links
 George Loper, "Elections 2000: National Republican Congressional Committee Funds National Right to Life Committee and U.S. Family Network," Loper.org, December 1999.
"GOP group pays $280,000 campaign fine," Associated Press (MSNBC), April 9, 2004.
"NRCC busted for illegal 'soft money' donations," The Carpetbagger Report, April 9, 2004.
"Political Contributions by DeLay Alumni During the 2003-2004 Election Cycle," Tech Politics (CQ Weekly, Federal Election Commission downloaded March 2005.)

American lobbyists
American evangelicals
Place of birth missing (living people)
Year of birth missing (living people)
Living people
Political chiefs of staff
United States congressional aides
Maryland Republicans